Helene Rønningen (born 4 September 1998) is a Norwegian athlete competing in 100 metres and 200 metres events.

In 2018, she set a new national record of 23.41s in the indoor 200 metres event at the Norwegian Indoor Athletics Championships.

Achievements

References

External links 

 

1998 births
Living people
Place of birth missing (living people)
Norwegian female sprinters